The Winnipeg City Council is the governing body of the city of Winnipeg, Manitoba, Canada. The Council is seated in the Council Building of Winnipeg City Hall.

The composition of the Council consists of 15 city councillors and a mayor. Each councillor represents an individual ward throughout the city while the mayor is elected every four years by a vote of the city-at-large.

Overview 

Part 3 of The City of Winnipeg Charter legislates the composition of Winnipeg City Council, which currently consists of 15 councillors and the Mayor. Each councillor represents an individual ward while the mayor is elected by a vote of the city-at-large.

Councillors have a dual role: they are members of Council, dealing with decisions that affect the whole city; and members of the Community Committees, dealing with issues within local communities.

Wards

Current wards

Past wards 
Into its first civic election on 5 January 1874, Winnipeg had a total of 4 city wards—North, South, East, and West.

The city's wards were reorganized in 1881, with the addition of Fort Rouge as Ward One, and existing wards to the north of the Assiniboine River being reorganized into Wards Two through Six. In 1906, Elmwood was added as Ward Seven in 1906, becoming was the city's first extension across the Red River. These seven wards were collapsed into three in 1920: Wards One and Two became Ward One; Wards Three and Four became Ward Two; and Wards Five, Six, and Seven became Ward Three.

Following the amalgamation of Winnipeg, the new unified Council represented 50 wards.

History

Early years 
Winnipeg officially became incorporated as a city on 8 November 1873, with the passing of An Act to Incorporate the City of Winnipeg by the Manitoba Legislature. Among other things, the Act outlined the essential powers for Winnipeg City Council. The Act also dictated qualifications for candidates who wished to run for mayor or alderman in the city’s first election. They had to be male freeholders or householders; natural born or naturalized subjects of the British Crown; 21 years of age or more; and resident in the city for at least 3 months prior to the election.

With a total of 4 city wards—North, South, East, and West—Winnipeg's first civic election took place on 5 January 1874, resulting in the election of Francis Evans Cornish as the first mayor of Winnipeg. In addition, the city’s first elected aldermen were:

 John Byron More, William Gomez Fonseca, and Alexander Logan — North Ward
 James McLenaghan, Herbert Swinford, Thomas Scott (resigned 12 May 1874), and John Robson Cameron — South Ward
 W. B. Thibaudeau, Andrew Strang, and Robert Mulvey — East Ward
 James H. Ashdown, Archibald Wright, and John Higgins — West Ward

At this time, the mayor was elected for a one-year term; this would remain until 1955, when the term of office for the mayor was changed to two years. The first Winnipeg City Council established standing committees on finance, printing, board of works, markets, fire & water, and assessment. Council subsequently began to establish itself through the passage of by-laws, with 27 by-laws being passed in the city’s first year of incorporation. After the first election, candidates were required to meet a property qualification; this requirement for alderman was abolished in 1918 and for mayoralty candidates in 1920 through a Charter amendment.

The city's wards were reorganized in 1881, with the addition of Fort Rouge as Ward One, and existing wards to the north of the Assiniboine River being reorganized into Wards Two through Six. In 1906, Elmwood was added as Ward Seven in 1906, becoming was the city's first extension across the Red River. These seven wards were collapsed into three in 1920: Wards One and Two became Ward One; Wards Three and Four became Ward Two; and Wards Five, Six, and Seven became Ward Three.

While the norm in the city's early years was for local elected officials to be English Protestants, there were still exceptions who won elections: Arni Frederickson (Ward 5, 1891) and Arni Eggertson (Ward 4, 1906) were Icelandic; Moses Finkelstein and Altar Skaletar (Ward 5, 1912) were Jewish; and Theodore Stefanik (Ward 5, 1911) was the first Ukrainian elected to City Council.

Over a decade after the first election, in 1887, civic suffrage was afforded to women in Winnipeg, 80 of whom being eligible to vote in that year's civic election and 476 in the election of 1888. In regards to holding office, however, women would not able to in Winnipeg until 1916, after which Alice A. Holling in 1917 (Ward 7) became the first woman to run for Council. (Holling lost to Alexander McLennan, 693 to 358.) In December 1920, Jessie Kirk became the first woman elected to Council, serving a two-year term on Council for Ward 2; she was, however, defeated each time in subsequent elections in 1922, 1923, 1926, and 1934.

The 1920 election that elected Jessie Kirk also saw city elections begin to use proportional representation in the form of Single Transferable Voting. Often mixed crops of councillors were elected in the multi-member wards, with each voter casting only one (transferable) vote. PR was used until 1970 for city elections. (STV was also used to elect Winnipeg MLAs from 1920 to 1952.)

The 1922 election elected Edward Parnell as mayor. He is only Winnipeg mayor to die in office, passing on June 9 of the following year.

Metro Winnipeg 
In 1955, the Government of Manitoba created the Greater Winnipeg Investigating Commission to look into inter-municipal issues in the Greater Winnipeg area. The Commission took four years and concluded with the recommendation that a strong central government be formed, which resulted in the incorporation of the Metropolitan Corporation of Greater Winnipeg (Metro Winnipeg) in 1960.

From 1960 until 1971, the Metro Winnipeg administrative system included Winnipeg and 12 other municipalities under a single metropolitan government, in a "two-tier" system in which councillors were elected through single transferable vote. In this framework, each municipality managed their own affairs, levied their own taxes, and took responsibility for local roads, water, and parks. In addition to this, however, an additional metropolitan level of government existed as well, which held responsibility for planning major roads, parks, and water and sewer systems.

In the late 1960s, a reform model was proposed for making this system more efficient and coordinated. Under this model, the coordination of policy and administration was to be facilitated by the close cooperation of a Board of Commissioners, who would act as the senior officers of the city's civil service, and the 50-member City Council with its 3 standing committees (Finance, Environment, and Works and Operations). In order to deliver services at the local level, the city was to be divided into 13 community committee areas, with each community committee composed of the City Councillors within the given community's boundaries.

Unicity 

On 27 July 1971, the City of Winnipeg Act incorporated the City of Winnipeg (1874–1971); the rural municipalities of Charleswood, Fort Garry, North Kildonan, and Old Kildonan; the Town of Tuxedo; the cities of East Kildonan, West Kildonan, St. Vital, Transcona, St. Boniface, and St. James-Assiniboia; and the Metropolitan Corporation of Greater Winnipeg into one city, commonly referred to as unicity.

The unicity system replaced the two-tier metropolitan system with first-past-the-post voting.

The election of the first new Winnipeg City Council was held on 6 October 1971 and the new City came into legal existence on 1 January 1972. Beginning in 1972, the new unified Council consisted of 50 councillors, one elected from each of the city's 50 wards, and a mayor, elected by voters in the city-at-large. The inaugural meeting of the new City Council subsequently took place in the Council Chamber of the Winnipeg Civic Centre on 4 January 1972.

The number of councillors were reduced to 29 part-time councilors in 1977. It was then further reduced to 15 full-time councillors in 1991 when the Government of Manitoba passed Bill 68, which took effect in the 1992 municipal election and has stayed the same for subsequent elections.

List of Winnipeg City Councils

2022–2026

{| class="wikitable sortable" width="75%"
! style="background:#cccccc;" | Councillor 
! style="background:#cccccc;" | Ward'|-
| Scott Gillingham || Mayor
|-
| Evan Duncan || Charleswood-Tuxedo-Westwood
|-
| Cindy Gilroy || Daniel McIntyre
|-
| Jason Schreyer || Elmwood-East Kildonan
|-
| Sherri Rollins || Fort Rouge-East Fort Garry
|-
| Ross Eadie || Mynarski
|-
| Jeff Browaty || North Kildonan
|-
| Devi Sharma || Old Kildonan
|-
| Vivian Santos || Point Douglas
|-
| John Orlikow || River Heights-Fort Garry
|-
| Matt Allard || St. Boniface
|-
| Shawn Dobson || St. James
|-
| Markus Chambers || St. Norbert-Seine River
|-
| Brian Mayes || St. Vital
|-
| Russ Wyatt || Transcona
|-
| Janice Lukes  || Waverley West
|}

2018–2022

2014–2018

2010–2014

2006–2010

 Pre-Unicity municipalities 

Reeves and mayors of the municipalities within the Greater Winnipeg area prior to their amalgamation into Winnipeg on 27 July 1971.

 Organizations under Council 

 Committees 
Section 63(1) of The City of Winnipeg Charter allows Winnipeg City Council the authority to establish committees of Council. Through by-law, Council is able to delegate powers, duties, or functions to a committee. Committees include standing committees and community committees.

The first Winnipeg City Council established standing committees on finance, printing, board of works, markets, fire & water, and assessment. Council subsequently began to establish itself through the passage of by-laws, with 27 by-laws being passed in the city’s first year of incorporation.

Each of the 15 Councillors represents a ward within Winnipeg, with three wards composing a Community Committee. The five Community Committees of the 2018-2022 period are

 City Centre Community Committee — Daniel McIntyre Ward, River Heights–Fort Garry Ward, and Fort-Rouge–East Fort Garry Ward
 Assiniboia Community Committee — St. James Ward, Charleswood–Tuxedo Ward, and Waverley West
 Lord Selkirk-West Kildonan Community Committee — Mynarski Ward, Point Douglas Ward, and Old Kildonan Ward
 East Kildonan-Transcona Community Committee — North Kildonan Ward, Transcona Ward, and Elmwood-East Kildonan Ward
 Riel Community Committee — St. Boniface Ward, St. Norbert–Seine River Ward, and St. Vital Ward

The Winnipeg City Council has established six standing policy committees for the period of 1 November 2020 to 31 October 2021, some having ad-hoc'' committees of their own:

 on Infrastructure Renewal and Public Works
 on Innovation and Economic Development
 on Finance
 on Property and Development, Heritage and Downtown Development
 on Protection, Community Services and Parks
 Ad Hoc Committee on Non-Essential Pesticide Reduction
 on Water and Waste, Riverbank Management and the Environment

In addition, the Executive Policy Committee is composed of Mayor Brian Bowman (Chairperson) and Councillors Matt Allard, Jeff Browaty, Scott Gillingham, Cindy Gilroy, Brian Mayes, and Sherri Rollins. This Committee also includes the Ad Hoc Committee on Development Standards.

Boards and commissions 
Responsibility over the management and administration of certain public services have been delegated by Winnipeg City Council to autonomous organizations (boards and commissions). These boards and commissions are appointed, wholly or partly, by Council and are granted authority either by the relevant Council by-laws or by Act of the Manitoba Legislature. A majority of these boards and commissions are composed of members of the public, as well as members of Council.

, the following are the existing boards and commissions of Council:

 Assiniboine Park Conservancy Inc.
 Association of Manitoba Municipalities Inc
 Association of Manitoba Bilingual Municipalities
 Board of Adjustment
 Board of Appeal (Local Improvement Assessment Appeals)
 Board of Revision
 Canadian Capital Cities
 Centreport Canada
 Centreventure Development Corporation
 City Council Benefits Board
 Community Emergency Advisory Committee
 Concordia Hospital Board of Directors
 Convention Centre Corporation
 Economic Development Winnipeg Inc.
 EdgeCorp Joint Venture Agreement
 Federation of Canadian Municipalities
 Fire Fighters Museum
 Francophone and Francophile Cities Network
 French Language Services Liaison
 The Forks North Portage Partnership
 General Council of Winnipeg Community Centres (GCWCC) Board of Directors
 Governance Committee of Council
 Heritage Winnipeg Corporation
 Historical Buildings and Resources Committee
 Human Rights Committee of Council
 Library Advisory Committees
 Records Committee
 River Park South Joint Venture Agreement
 Ross House Museum
 Red River Basin Commission
 St. Boniface Museum Board
 St. James-Assiniboia Museum Board
 Grant’s Old Mill (St. James-Assiniboia Pioneer Association Inc.)
 Seven Oaks House Museum Board
 Take Pride Winnipeg
 Transcona Historical Museum Board
 Transcona West Joint Venture Agreement
 Transit Advisory Committee
 Urban Design Advisory Committee
 Vehicle for Hire Appeal Board
 Winnipeg Airports Authority Board
 Winnipeg Art Gallery Board of Governors
 Winnipeg Arts Council Inc.
 Winnipeg Building Commission
 Winnipeg Committee For Safety
 Winnipeg Enterprises Corporation
 Winnipeg Food Council
 Winnipeg Housing Rehabilitation Corporation
 Winnipeg Housing Steering Committee
 Winnipeg Metropolitan Region
 Winnipeg Police Board
 Winnipeg Police Pension Board
 Winnipeg Public Library Board

References

External links
 Winnipeg City Council

Municipal councils in Manitoba
Municipal government of Winnipeg